Gul Mohammad Pahlawan (or Gulo) was an Uzbek leader during the violent power-struggles of 1990s Afghanistan, and a brother (in some sources brother-in-law) of leader Abdul Malik Pahlawan. Gul Mohammad played a significant role in Abdul Malik's betrayal of and subsequent attacks against rival Uzbek Rashid Dostum, with Gul Mohammad leading on Dostum's forces in Jowzjan Province on 23 May 1997.

References

Afghan Uzbek politicians
Afghan military personnel
History of Jowzjan Province
Living people
Year of birth missing (living people)